Bog is a settlement in Jamaica. It has a population of 13,889 as of 2009.

References

Populated places in Jamaica